Epidichostates molossus is a species of beetle in the family Cerambycidae. It was described by Duvivier in 1892.

References

Crossotini
Beetles described in 1892